Harry Whalley (born 1984) is a Belfast-born composer based in Scotland whose output includes classical music, jazz, and film music.

Life and career
Whalley studied composition with Malcolm Edmonstone and later with Nigel Osborne and Peter Nelson and was awarded a Ph.D. in 2014.  His music has been performed by the Hebrides Ensemble, Artisan Trio, Red Note Ensemble, Vancouver Miniaturists Ensemble, Gildas Quartet, Edinburgh Quartet, Ensemble Eunoia and music for film at Palm Spring, Los Angeles, Berlin, and London.

In 2012, he was a winner of the West Cork Chamber Music Festival competition in composition for his string quartet Compression, which was performed by the Gildas Quartet and run as a master class with Thomas Larcher before its premiere. Harry Whalley is course leader in Music Composition and technology at the University for the Creative Arts.

Selected works
 Seven Rocks (2014), for string quartet
 Entangled Music (2013)
 Clasp Together, Beta (2012)
 Little Harmonic Labyrinth, video installation – Summerhall

References

External links
 
 
 

1984 births
20th-century classical composers
21st-century classical composers
Alumni of the University of Edinburgh
British male classical composers
Irish classical composers
Irish film score composers
Irish male classical composers
Living people
Scottish classical composers
20th-century British composers
British male film score composers
20th-century British male musicians
21st-century British male musicians